The 1978–79 season was Kilmarnock's 77th in Scottish League Competitions. They finished in 2nd place and were promoted at the end of the season to the Premier Division.

Scottish First Division

Scottish League Cup

Scottish Cup

See also 
List of Kilmarnock F.C. seasons

References

External links 
https://www.fitbastats.com/kilmarnock/team_results_season.php

Kilmarnock F.C. seasons
Kilmarnock